John Nolan may refer to:

Entertainment 
 John Nolan (musician) (born 1978), American musician with Taking Back Sunday and Straylight Run
 Jonathan Nolan (born 1976), British-American writer and producer
 John Nolan (British actor) (born 1938), British actor and the uncle of Jonathan
 John Nolan (American actor) (1933–2000), American actor
 John Nolan (dancer) (born 1990), Irish dancer and choreographer

Politics 
 John A. Nolan (1930–2004), broadcaster and politician in Newfoundland, Canada
 John Nolan (Irish politician) (died 1948), Irish Cumann na nGaedhael politician
 John I. Nolan (1874–1922), American politician from California
 John Philip Nolan (1838–1912), Irish landowner, army officer and politician

Sports 
 John Nolan (hurler) (born 1954), Irish hurler of the 1970s and 80s for Wexford
 John Nolan (1950s hurler), Irish hurler of the 1950s and 60s for Wexford, see List of All-Ireland Senior Hurling Championship medal winners
 John Nolan (guard) (1899–1973), offensive guard for the Los Angeles Buccaneers in 1926
 John Nolan (tackle) (1926–1996), American football tackle

Other 
 John James Nolan (1888–1952), Irish physicist, President of the Royal Irish Academy, 1949–52
 John Gavin Nolan (1924–1999), Roman Catholic bishop
 John Nolan, the protagonist of the ABC comedy-drama The Rookie
 Johnny Nolan, a major character in Betty Smith's  novel A Tree Grows in Brooklyn